Davi may refer to:
Davi (Pashtun tribe), a Pashtun tribe of central Asia
DAVI, the Dutch Automated Vehicle Initiative

Davi is also a variant of the name David. Notable people with this name include:

Given name
Davi Banda (born 1983), Malawian footballer
Davi Cortes da Silva (born 1963), Brazilian footballer
Davi José Silva do Nascimento (born 1984), Brazilian footballer
Davi Kopenawa Yanomami (born 1956), Brazilian activist
Davi Mbala (born 1993), Congolese footballer
Davi Napoleon (born 1946), American theater historian and critic
Davi Paes Silva (born 1945), Brazilian religious leader
Davi Rancan (born 1981), Brazilian footballer
Davi Ribeiro de Carvalho (born 1979), Brazilian futsal player
Davi Rodrigues de Jesus (born 1984), Brazilian footballer
Davi Sacer (born 1975), Brazilian Christian singer

Surname
Arnau Brugués Davi (born 1985), Spanish tennis player
Hendrik Davi (born 1977), French politician
Guido Davì (born 1990), Italian footballer
Mara Davi, American actress
Robert Davi (born 1953), American actor

See also

Daffy (disambiguation)
Darvi (disambiguation)
Davie (disambiguation)
Davis (disambiguation)
Davy (disambiguation)
Devi (disambiguation)